UEL can refer to:

 UEFA Europa League, the second tier of European club football
 United Envirotech, a company based in Singapore
 University of East London, a public University in London, UK
 Universidade Estadual de Londrina (State University of Londrina), a state university in Londrina, Brazil
 United Empire Loyalists, pro-British colonists who left the United States for Canada after the Revolutionary War
 University Endowment Lands, a suburb adjacent to Vancouver, British Columbia, Canada
 Upper explosive limit, maximum concentration in air that will burn
 Unified Expression Language, part of Java EE 6

See also
 Uel (disambiguation), name of a minor old Testament figure, used as a given name
 UEL (Universal Exit Language), a command in Hewlett-Packard Printer Command Language, used at the end of a printer data stream